The Prevention of Crime Act 1959 is a Malaysian law which enacted to deal with crime prevention and for the control of criminals, members of secret societies, terrorists and other undesirable persons. Persons detained under the Act were not precluded from making a claim 'Habeas Corpus' (a court order to release the person detained is not in accordance with legal procedures that should be). Originally, POCA only came into force in peninsular Malaysia.

The act is necessary to stop action by a substantial body of persons both inside and outside Malaysia to cause, or to cause a substantial number of citizens to fear, organized violence against persons or property.

Structure
The Prevention of Crime Act 1959, in its current form (1 December 2015), consists of 5 Parts containing 23 sections and 3 schedules (including 12 amendments).
 Part I: Powers of Arrest and Remand
 Part II: Inquiries
 Part III: Registration
 Part IV: Consequences of Registration
 Part IVA: Detention Orders
 Part V: General
 Schedules

References

External links
 Prevention of Crime Act 1959 

1959 in Malayan law
Malaysian federal legislation
Crime in Malaysia